is a middle school and high school in the Kokuba district of Naha, Okinawa. Okisho, as it is called, is known for its performance in high school baseball tournaments, including National tournament wins in 1999 and 2008.

Its colors are green, yellow, and maize.
The school motto is "恐れず、侮らず、気負わず," which can directly be translated to "Without fear, disdain, or over-eagerness."

References

External links 
 Okinawa Shogaku Junior & Senior High Schools (English)
Okinawa Shogaku Junior & Senior High Schools (Japanese)

High schools in Okinawa Prefecture
Private schools in Japan
Naha
Schools in Okinawa Prefecture